Houston Ballet’s Ben Stevenson Academy is a ballet training school affiliated with the Houston Ballet.  The academy is housed in Houston Ballet Center for Dance in Houston, Texas.

History
In 1955, the Houston Ballet Academy was established under the leadership of Tatiana Semenova, a former dancer with the Ballet Russe de Monte Carlo.  In July 2003, Houston Ballet Academy was renamed Houston Ballet’s Ben Stevenson Academy in honor of Ben Stevenson, former artistic director of the professional company and director of the academy.

Divisions

Main School Division
Children age seven and older may audition for admission into Levels 1-8 of the Main School program. Auditions are held twice a year.  Students follow a structured sequence of training stages designed to increase their technical skills, stamina and discipline in accordance with their age and physical development.

Pre-Professional Division
Houston Ballet II (HBII) is the top level and pre-professional division of the Academy, and students attend daily class taught by instructors from both the Academy and the Houston Ballet company.

External links

Houston Ballet
Ballet schools in the United States
Private schools in Houston
Dance in Texas